Meldon may refer to:

Places
 Meldon, Devon, England, a hamlet
 Meldon, Northumberland, England, a village
 Meldon railway station

People
 Charles Henry Meldon (1841–1892), Irish barrister and nationalist politician
 George Meldon (1885–1951), Irish cricketer
 George Meldon (cricketer, born 1875) (1875–1950), Irish cricketer
 Jack Meldon (1869–1954), Irish cricketer
 Louis Meldon (1886–1956), Irish cricketer and tennis player
 Philip Meldon (1874–1942), Irish cricketer and footballer
 William Meldon (1879–1957), Irish cricketer
 Mel Levine (born 1943), American attorney and politician